Circus is the second Japanese-language extended play (EP) by South Korean boy band Stray Kids. It was released on June 22, 2022, through Epic Records Japan. Centered on a circus concept with hip hop, trap, rock, and pop elements, the EP consists of six tracks, preceded by the Japanese version of "Maniac", "Your Eyes", and the title track. Commercially, Circus debuted at number two on the Oricon Albums Chart, and atop Billboard Japan Hot Albums, and was certified platinum by Recording Industry Association of Japan (RIAJ), surpassing 250,000 copies.

Background and release

On April 4, 2022, two weeks after the group's sixth Korean extended play (EP) Oddinary release, Stray Kids announced their second Japanese EP, scheduled for release on June 22, after their first Japan leg of their Maniac World Tour ends. Pre-orders for the EP began on the same date, coming in four editions on CD–limited A, limited B, regular, and FC. The limited A edition additionally includes DVD, while the limited B SpecialZine. In a Pia Music Complex magazine interview on April 21, Bang Chan stated that the EP will give the group's "refreshing power" and "blow away all the heat of summer", while Changbin said that they will show both "unique" and "different" side of the EP.

From May 12 to 16, Stray Kids posted individual and group teaser images, depicting a concept of circus. On May 16, the EP's title was revealed, named Circus, alongside the cover artworks for each edition, and the track listing, containing three new tracks, and the Japanese versions of "Venom" and "Maniac" from Oddinary (2022), and "Silent Cry" from Noeasy (2021). Additionally, the limited A edition includes the music video of the previous-release single "Scars", and its behind-the-scene. The EP was preceded by three single: "Maniac (Japanese ver.)", released on May 18, "Your Eyes" on June 1, and the title track on June 10. The latter two were released alongside their accomapying music videos.

Music and lyrics

Circus is nineteen minutes and eleven seconds long, consisting of six tracks. It opens with the title track, "Circus", a hip hop-dance track centered on the circus theme, featuring "vaulting" pluck bass, "addictive" vocal chops, and "solid" drums, which make sounds like elephant footsteps in the circus". It is followed by the second track "Fairytale", based on the theme "the ideal love of the world is all like a fairy tale". The final track, "Your Eyes", is a ballad love song driven by piano about the lover's gaze with the feeling of anxiousness sometimes but still wishing to be happy in the relationship.

Promotion

To promote Circus, Stray Kids appeared on the covers and gave interviews for the July–October 2022 issue of Japanese magazines CanCam. Mini, Nikkei Entertainment!, Pia Music Complex, Vivi, Smart, and Rolling Stone Japan (only interview). The group appeared for televised interview at Venue101 on May 12, as well as the five-hour-special Kami Oto: Kamigata Otomatsuri on May 28, The Time on June 21, Mezamashi TV on June 23, and Asadesu on June 29. FamilyMart, HEP Five, and FuRyu partnered with Stray Kids for several campaigns to commemorate the release of Circus in June.

Stray Kids gave the debut performance of "Circus" at the first Kobe show of the Maniac World Tour in Japan on June 11. On the same day, they performed "Maniac (Japanese ver.)" at Venue 101, broadcast from World Memorial Hall, where they held the concert. The group appeared on the morning show Sukkiri on June 14, to perform "Circus". Following the EP release, Stray Kids held the pre-recorded livestream event to introduced the EP via YouTube, TikTok, and Abema. The group performed "Circus", along with "Back Door", at Buzz Rhythm 02 on July 9, and the two-hour special Music Station on August 5.

Commercial performance

According to Oricon, Circus has sold 97,804 copies on June 21, 2022, the flying get date. The EP entered Oricon Albums Chart at number two with 131,921 CD copies in its first week, behind only Tatsuro Yamashita's 2022 album Softly. It also debuted at number one on the Billboard Japan Hot Albums, selling 198,239 physical copies (number one on the Top Album Sales), and 986 downloads (number eight on the Download Chart) on the first week. The album also charted on the ARIA Physical Albums at number 12, and the Croatian HDU International Albums at number 28.

Track listing

Notes
 The Japanese title of track 3 "" (Kumo no Ito) means a spider's thread.

Credits and personnel

Musicians

 Stray Kids – vocals, background vocals
 Bang Chan (3Racha) – lyrics , composition , arrangement , all instruments , computer programming , vocal directing 
 Changbin (3Racha) – lyrics , composition , vocal directing 
 Han (3Racha) – lyrics , composition , vocal directing 
 KM-Markit – Japanese lyrics 
 Yohei – Japanese lyrics 
 Earattack – background vocals , composition , arrangement , all instruments , computer programming , vocal directing 
 Chan's – composition , arrangement , all instruments , computer programming 
 Darm – composition , arrangement , all instruments , computer programming 
 Millionboy – composition , arrangement , all instruments , computer programming , vocal directing 
 DallasK – composition , arrangement , all instruments , computer programming 
 Versachoi – composition , arrangement , all instruments , computer programming 
 Hong Ji-sang – composition , arrangement , all instruments , electric guitar , bass , keyboards , computer programming , vocal directing 
 Jun2 – composition , arrangement , all instruments , vocal directing 

Technical

 Goo Hye-jin – recording 
 Park Eun-jung – recording 
 Bang Chan (3Racha) – recording , digital editing 
 Lim Hong-jin – recording , mixing 
 Eom Se-hee – recording 
 Hong Ji-sang – recording , digital editing 
 Lee Sang-yeop – recording 
 Lee Kyeong-won – digital editing 
 Park Nam-jun – digital editing , mixing assistant 
 Lee Tae-sub – mixing 
 Shin Bong-won – mixing 
 Manny Marroquin – mixing 
 Kwon Nam-woo – mastering 
 Dave Kutch – mastering 

Locations

 Sony Music Publishing (Japan) Inc. – publishing
 JYP Publishing (KOMCA) – publishing
 Music Cube Inc. – publishing 
 Cube Entertainment Inc. – publishing 
 Fujipacific Music Korea Inc. – publishing 
 Prescription Songs (ASCAP) – publishing 
 JYPE Studios – recording, mixing 
 Channie's "Room" – recording 
 Jisang's Studio – recording 
 KayOne Sounds – digital editing 
 Glab Studio – digital editing , mixing 
 Larrabee Studios – mixing 
 821 Sound Mastering – mastering 
 The Mastering Palace – mastering

Charts

Weekly charts

Monthly charts

Year-end charts

Certifications and sales

Release history

See also
 List of Billboard Japan Hot Albums number ones of 2022

References

External links
  

2022 EPs
Japanese-language EPs
JYP Entertainment EPs
Sony Music Entertainment Japan EPs
Stray Kids EPs